Matthew Charles Johnson, professionally known as Matt Johnson (born December 6, 1996) is a country music singer and songwriter from Dallas, Texas. Johnson was a contestant on Radio Disney’s Next Big Thing season two.

Johnson has shared the stage with the Jonas Brothers and Jordan Pruitt, and has performed in shows with the Dallas Cowboys Cheerleaders and various contestants from the television shows So You Think You Can Dance and American Idol. Johnson is a contributing artist for Banshee Music.

In November 2010, Johnson was featured on Seventeen.com and on Clevver TV.

In October 2011, Johnson's song Defying Gravity was played on ABC Family's The Lying Game in season one episode nine.

In September 2012, Johnson won the local round of Texaco Country Showdown.

References

1996 births
Musicians from Dallas
American country singer-songwriters
Living people
Singer-songwriters from Texas
21st-century American singers
Country musicians from Texas